Francesca Bettrone (born 5 August 1991) is an Italian speed skater who competed in the 2015–16 ISU Speed Skating World Cup, the 2016–17 ISU Speed Skating World Cup and the 2017 European Speed Skating Championships.

Personal records

References

External links
 Eurosport profile
 

1991 births
Italian female speed skaters
Living people
Speed skaters at the 2018 Winter Olympics
Olympic speed skaters of Italy
Competitors at the 2009 World Games